The CR postcode area, also known as the Croydon postcode area, is a group of eight postcode districts in England, within ten post towns. These cover parts of southern Greater London and north-east Surrey.

The main sorting office is in Croydon, and the area served includes most of the London Borough of Croydon, the southeastern part of the London Borough of Merton and small parts of the London Boroughs of Sutton and Bromley. Most of CR3 and CR6 cover the northern part of the Tandridge district of Surrey, and the southern part of CR5 covers a small part of the borough of Reigate and Banstead.

Croydon was the second town, after Norwich, to have experimental postcodes, introduced in 1966. This trialled the postcode area CRO (letter 'O'), while Norwich used NOR for its equivalent. It was decided that the outward (first) part of a postcode should be alphanumerical, so CRO became CR0 (with a zero) and NOR became NR1. The CR1 postcode has not been introduced, making CR the only postcode area with a district 0 but not a district 1.

The CR0 postcode district covers the largest population in the UK.



Coverage
The approximate coverage of the postcode districts:

! CR0
| CROYDON
| Croydon, Addiscombe, Woodside (part), Selhurst, Broad Green, Spring Park, Shirley, Addington, New Addington, Coombe, Forestdale, Waddon, Beddington, Thornton Heath (part), Valley Retail and Leisure Park, Mitcham Common (part)
| Croydon, Sutton
|-
! CR2
| SOUTH CROYDON
| South Croydon, Sanderstead, Selsdon, part of Addington
| Croydon
|-
!rowspan=2|CR3
| CATERHAM
| Caterham, Chaldon, Woldingham
|rowspan=2|Croydon, Tandridge
|-
| WHYTELEAFE
| Whyteleafe
|-
! CR4
| MITCHAM
| Mitcham, Mitcham Common, Pollards Hill (part), Eastfields (part)
| Croydon, Merton, Sutton
|-
! CR5
| COULSDON
| Coulsdon, Old Coulsdon, Chipstead, Hooley, Netherne-on-the-Hill, part of Woodmansterne, Clockhouse, part of Little Woodcote
| Croydon, Reigate and Banstead, Sutton
|-
! CR6
| WARLINGHAM
| Warlingham, parts of Chelsham and Farleigh, Hamsey Green
| Bromley, Croydon, Tandridge
|-
! CR7
| THORNTON HEATH
| Thornton Heath, Broad Green (part), Pollards Hill (part)
| Croydon, Merton
|-
!rowspan=2|CR8
| PURLEY
| Purley, Russell Hill, Reedham, London
|rowspan=2|Croydon, Sutton, Tandridge
|-
| KENLEY
| Kenley
|-
! style="background:#FFFFFF;"|CR9
| style="background:#FFFFFF;"|CROYDON
| style="background:#FFFFFF;"|
| style="background:#FFFFFF;"|non-geographic
|-
! style="background:#FFFFFF;"|CR44
| style="background:#FFFFFF;"|CROYDON
| style="background:#FFFFFF;"|Jobcentre Plus
| style="background:#FFFFFF;"|non-geographic
|-
! style="background:#FFFFFF;"|CR90
| style="background:#FFFFFF;"|CROYDON
| style="background:#FFFFFF;"|
| style="background:#FFFFFF;"|non-geographic
|}

Delivery Offices
Delivery offices are located at Croydon, South Croydon, Caterham, Mitcham, Coulsdon, Thornton Heath and Purley.

Map

See also
 List of postcode areas in the United Kingdom
 Postcode Address File

References

External links
 Royal Mail's Postcode Address File
 A quick introduction to Royal Mail's Postcode Address File (PAF)

Postcode areas covering London
Postcode areas covering South East England
Media and communications in the London Borough of Croydon
Media and communications in the London Borough of Merton